George Russell Pepperell (23 April 1918 – 15 January 2003) was an English professional rugby league footballer who played in the 1930s, 1940s and 1950s, and coached in the 1950s and 1960s, and rugby union footballer who played in the 1940s.

Background
Russ Pepperell was born in Seaton, Cumberland, his birth was registered in Cockermouth district, England, he was the younger brother of the rugby league footballer; Stanley Pepperell, and the older brother of the rugby league footballer; Albert Pepperell, he was a Lance Corporal in the British Army during World War II, and he died aged 84 in Bundaberg, Australia.

Playing career
Russell Pepperell was a reserve for Northern Command XIII against a Rugby League XIII at Thrum Hall, Halifax on Saturday 21 March 1942.

Pepperell played full-back in Rugby League XV's 18–11 victory over Northern Command XV in the rugby union match on Saturday 23 January 1943.

Pepperell won caps for England while at Huddersfield in 1947 against France, and Wales, in 1948 against Wales, and in 1949 against France, and also represented Cumberland.

Pepperell played  in Cumberland's 5–4 victory over Australia in the 1948–49 Kangaroo tour of Great Britain and France match at the Recreation Ground, Whitehaven on Wednesday 13 October 1948, in front of a crowd of 8,818.

Pepperell's Testimonial match at Huddersfield took place in 1950.

Pepperell played right-, i.e. number 3, and was captain in Huddersfield's 15–10 victory over St. Helens in the 1953 Challenge Cup Final during the 1952–53 season at Wembley Stadium, London  on Saturday 25 April 1953, in front of a crowd of 89,588.

Pepperell played  in Huddersfield's 4–11 defeat by Bradford Northern in the 1949 Yorkshire County Cup Final during the 1949–50 season at Headingley Rugby Stadium, Leeds on Saturday 29 October 1949, played, and scored 2-tries in the  16–3 victory over Castleford in the 1950 Yorkshire County Cup Final during the 1950–51 season at Headingley Rugby Stadium, Leeds on Saturday 4 November 1950, and played  in the 18–8 victory over Batley in the 1952 Yorkshire County Cup Final during the 1952–53 season at Headingley Rugby Stadium, Leeds on Saturday 15 November 1952.

After he finished playing, Pepperell became Huddersfield's coach. He later moved to Australia as coach of Sydney's Manly-Warringah club for the 1964 NSWRFL season. He remained in the position for one more season. Pepperell stayed in Australia and died in Queensland in 2003.

References

External links
Obituary in The Independent
Seaton man captained Huddersfield to the cup
Photograph "Largest ever Northern Crowd - 14th March 1953 saw the largest ever crowd to watch a Bradford Northern game at Odsal when Huddersfield were the visitors in a third round Challenge Cup tie. Northern lost the tie 7-17. - Date: 14/03/1953" at rlhp.co.uk
Search for "Russell Pepperell" at britishnewspaperarchive.co.uk
Search for "Russ Pepperell" at britishnewspaperarchive.co.uk

1918 births
2003 deaths
British Army personnel of World War II
British Army soldiers
Cumberland rugby league team players
England national rugby league team players
English rugby league coaches
English rugby league players
English rugby union players
Huddersfield Giants coaches
Huddersfield Giants players
Keighley Cougars coaches
Manly Warringah Sea Eagles coaches
Rugby league centres
Rugby league five-eighths
Rugby league fullbacks
Rugby league players from Seaton, Cumbria
Rugby league wingers
Rugby union fullbacks
Rugby union players from Seaton, Cumbria